Saint-Pardoux-Isaac is a commune in the Lot-et-Garonne department in the Nouvelle-Aquitaine region of south-western France.

Demography

Places of interest
The church of St Pardoux
The thirteenth century church of Isaac, under the patronage of Saint Léger.

See also
Communes of the Lot-et-Garonne department

References

Saintpardouxisaac